Edwin Wright Schell (November 14, 1900 – October 7, 1979) was an American boxer who competed in the 1920 Summer Olympics. He was born in Berwyn, Illinois and died in San Diego, California. In 1920 he was eliminated in the quarter-finals of the light heavyweight class after losing his fight to the eventual silver medalist Sverre Sørsdal.

References

External links
profile

1900 births
1979 deaths
People from Berwyn, Illinois
Boxers from Illinois
Light-heavyweight boxers
Olympic boxers of the United States
Boxers at the 1920 Summer Olympics
American male boxers